Meromacrus is a genus of 43 neotropical and nearctic flower flies or hoverflies

Species 
M. abdominalis Sack, 1920
M. acutus (Fabricius, 1805)
M. aemulus (Williston, 1888)
M. anna Curran, 1936
M. auriferus Hull, 1942
M. basigera (Walker, 1860)
M. bruneri Curran, 1936
M. brunneus Hull, 1942
M. canusium (Walker, 1849)
M. ceres Hull, 1942
M. circumdatus (Bigot, 1875)
M. croceatus Hull, 1960
M. currani Hull, 1942
M. decorus (Loew, 1866)
M. draco Hull, 1942
M. farri Thompson, 1981
M. flavolinea Hull, 1949
M. fucatus Hull, 1930
M. ghilianii Rondani, 1848
M. gloriosus Hull, 1941
M. hinei Hull, 1942
M. laconicus (Walker, 1852)
M. lineascripta Hull, 1937
M. matilda Hull, 1949
M. melansoni Blatch, 2003
M. melmoth Hull, 1937
M. milesia Hull, 1942
M. minuticornis Thompson, 2001
M. nectarinoides (Lynch Arribalzaga, 1892)
M. niger Sack, 1920
M. obscurus Hine, 1924
M. pachypus (Wiedemann, 1830)
M. panamensis Curran, 1930
M. pinguis (Fabricius, 1775)
M. pinguius (Fabricius, 1773)
M. pluto Hull, 1942
M. pratorum (Fabricius, 1775)
M. ruficrus (Wiedemann, 1830)
M. scitus (Walker, 1857)
M. strigulus Hull, 1942
M. unicolor (Wulp, 1882)
M. villosus Hull, 1949
M. zonatus (Loew, 1866)

References

External links
See BugGuide page for images ( http://bugguide.net/node/view/41882/bgimage )

Diptera of North America
Diptera of South America
Eristalinae
Hoverfly genera
Taxa named by Camillo Rondani